Spacegirl and Other Favorites is the second album by The Brian Jonestown Massacre, recorded in 1993 but not released until 1995.

Background 

"Hide and Seek" was released as a single in 1994. The song "Swallowtail" was also written during these sessions, although a studio recording was not released commercially until 2001. Live versions of both these songs appear on Tepid Peppermint Wonderland: A Retrospective.

Track listing

2003 CD reissue bonus tracks
All songs written and composed by The Brian Jonestown Massacre.

Personnel
Anton Newcombe - guitar, vocals, organ
Jeffrey Davies - guitar
Thravis Threlkel - guitar
Matt Hollywood - bass
Rick Maymi - drums

References

External links 

 

1995 albums
The Brian Jonestown Massacre albums